Durrantia is a moth genus of the family Depressariidae.

Species
 Durrantia piperatella (Zeller, 1873)
 Durrantia arcanella (Busck, 1912)
 Durrantia amabilis Walsingham, 1912
 Durrantia resurgens Walsingham, 1912
 Durrantia pugnax Walsingham, 1912
 Durrantia flaccescens Meyrick, 1925

References

 
Peleopodinae
Moth genera